The legislative districts of Biñan are the representations of the component city of Biñan in the Congress of the Philippines. The city is currently represented in the lower house of the Congress through its lone congressional district.

History 
Biñan was represented in the Congress as part of the at-large district of Laguna in the Malolos Congress (1898–1899), National Assembly of the Second Philippine Republic (1943–1944) and Regular Batasang Pambansa (1984–1986) and the first district of Laguna from 1907–1941, 1945–1972, and 1987–2016. The province of Laguna was represented in the Interim Batasang Pambansa as part of Region IV-A from 1978 to 1984.

The President of the Republic of the Philippines signed on March 27, 2015 by the Republic Act No. 10658, separating Biñan from the first district of the province. The cities of San Pedro and Santa Rosa remained in the first district.

The city elected its first representative in the 2016 elections. However, for the purpose of electing Provincial Board members, the city's residents still vote as part of the province's 1st Sangguniang Panlalawigan district.

Lone District

See also 
Legislative districts of Laguna

References 

Biñan
Politics of Laguna (province)
Biñan